Paracostus is a group of plants in the family Costaceae described as a genus in 2006. It is native to Borneo and to tropical Africa.

Species

 Paracostus englerianus (K.Schum.) C.D.Specht - Ghana, Ivory Coast, Nigeria, Cameroon, Congo Republic, Gabon, Islands of the Gulf of Guinea
 Paracostus paradoxus (K.Schum.) C.D.Specht - Borneo

References

Costaceae
Zingiberales genera